The Projected Passion Revue is a compilation album by the group Dexys Midnight Runners, comprising recordings made in 1981, between the group's first album Searching for the Young Soul Rebels and its second, Too-Rye-Ay. The album represents a stage in the group's development which built upon the blue-eyed soul sound of the original line-up, but came before the group's adoption of a significant folk influence (and the addition of The Emerald Express to the line-up).

The album includes the A and B sides of Dexys Midnight Runners' three 1981 singles, three tracks recorded in session for Radio 1, and a live recording of a show in Dexys' "Projected Passion Revue" tour.

Track listing

 "Plan B" (single)
 "Soul Finger" (single B-side)
 Dialogue - Introduction by Gary Crowley (live)
 "Outlook" ( "Dubious" and "Spiritual Passion") (live)
 "Tell Me When My Light Turns Green" (live)
 "Soon/Plan B" (live)
 "Burn It Down" (live)
 "Respect" (live)
 "Until I Believe in My Soul" (live)
 "There There My Dear" (live)
 "Your Own" (a.k.a. "Liars A to E) (live)
 "Breaking Down The Walls of Heartache" (live)
 "Let's Make This Precious" (session)
 "Your Own" (a.k.a. "Liars A to E") (session)
 "Until I Believe in My Soul" (session)
 "Show Me" (single)
 "Soon" (single B-side)
 "Liars A to E" (single)
 "And Yes We Must Remain The Wildhearted Outsiders" (single B-side)

Tracks 1 & 2 originally a single released March 1981
Tracks 3-12 recorded live at Paris Theatre, London, May 30, 1981
Tracks 13-15 recorded for Richard Skinner session, July 9, 1981
Tracks 16 & 17 originally a single released July 1981
Tracks 18 & 19 originally a single released October 1981

Personnel
Kevin Rowland - vocals
Billy Adams - guitar
Steve Wynne - bass
Micky Billingham - organ, piano
Seb Shelton - drums
Paul Speare - tenor saxophone
Brian Maurice - alto saxophone
"Big" Jim Paterson - trombone

Dexys Midnight Runners albums
2007 compilation albums
Mercury Records compilation albums